Karl Wegele (27 September 1887 – 11 November 1960) was a German amateur football (soccer) player who competed in the 1912 Summer Olympics.

Career 
The forward won the German football championship in 1909 with Phönix Karlsruhe.

He was a member of the German Olympic squad and played one match in the main tournament as well as one match in the consolation tournament. Overall Wegele won 15 caps before the First World War.

References

External links
 
 
 

1887 births
1960 deaths
German footballers
Germany international footballers
Olympic footballers of Germany
Footballers at the 1912 Summer Olympics
Karlsruher SC players
Footballers from Karlsruhe
Association football forwards